Live in Chicago is a bonus CD release by American guitarist, composer, and vocalist Trey Anastasio, who is best known as a founder of the legendary rock band Phish. It was released as a free gift when Shine was pre-ordered. The tracks included on this disc are recordings of a live performance from August 10, 2005 at the Charter One Pavilion in Chicago, Illinois.

Track listing
 Drifting (Anastasio, Lawton, Markellis) - 6:34
 Burlap Sacks and Pumps (Anastasio) - 8:36
 Spin (Anastasio) - 6:02
 Mr. Completely (Anastasio) - 8:30
 Goodbye Head (Anastasio, Herman, Marshall) - 14:12
 First Tube (Anastasio, Lawton, Markellis) - 6:10

Personnel

Trey Anastasio – guitar, vocals
Christina Durfee – vocals
Les Hall – keyboards, guitar
Tony Hall – bass
Jennifer Hartswick – vocals
Ray Paczkowski – keys
Skeeto Valdez – drums

External links
Trey Anastasio's Official Website
Phish's Official Website

2005 EPs
Trey Anastasio EPs
2005 live albums
Live EPs
Columbia Records live albums
Columbia Records EPs